Joe Queenan may refer to:

Joe Queenan (author), American freelance satirist and critic
Joe Queenan (politician), Irish politician